Gérard Lebel (January 12, 1930—15 July 2020) was a Canadian politician from Quebec.

Background

He was born on January 12, 1930, in Rivière-du-Loup, Bas-Saint-Laurent.  He became an attorney.

Political career

Lebel ran as a Union Nationale candidate in the 1962 and 1966 elections against Liberal incumbent Alphonse Couturier in the district of Rivière-du-Loup.  He lost the first time, but was successful on his second attempt.

He served as Deputy Speaker of the House from 1966 to 1968, Speaker from 1968 to 1969 and Minister of Communications in Jean-Jacques Bertrand's Cabinet from 1969 to 1970.

Lebel was defeated against Liberal candidate Paul Lafrance in the 1970 election.

References

1930 births
Living people
Union Nationale (Quebec) MNAs
People from Rivière-du-Loup
Vice Presidents of the National Assembly of Quebec
Université Laval alumni